Patricia Rodas (born 22 June 1960) is a Honduran politician who is a former Minister for Foreign Affairs and leading member of the Liberal Party of Honduras.  Deposed in July 2009, she subsequently played a role in establishing the Liberty and Refoundation party.

Biography 
The daughter of the former president of the National Congress of Honduras, Modesto Rodas Alvarado, Rodas began her political career in the Liberal Party, rising to the role of President of the party's Central Executive Council, before being appointed foreign minister in the government of Manuel Zelaya.

2009 Honduran constitutional crisis

Deposed during the 2009 Honduran constitutional crisis, she was held captive by the Honduran military and forced into exile in Mexico. While there, she became a spokesperson for Zelaya in his attempts to regain the presidency.

See also

 Manuel Zelaya#Constitutional crisis

References

1960 births
Living people
Foreign Ministers of Honduras
Government ministers of Honduras
Liberal Party of Honduras politicians
Honduran Marxists
21st-century Honduran women politicians
21st-century Honduran politicians
Women government ministers of Honduras